Okehampton is a town and civil parish in West Devon in the English county of Devon. It is situated at the northern edge of Dartmoor, and had a population of 5,922 at the 2011 census. Two electoral wards are based in the town (east and west). Their joint population at the same census was 7,500.

History

Okehampton was founded by the Saxons. It was recorded as a place for slaves to be freed at cross roads.

Like many towns in the West Country, Okehampton grew on the medieval wool trade. Notable buildings in the town include the 15th century chapel of St. James and Okehampton Castle, which was established by the Norman Sheriff of Devon, Baldwin FitzGilbert (d.1090), and the 17th century Okehampton Town Hall.

Feudal barony

Okehampton was the caput of a large feudal barony, which at the time of the Domesday Book was held by Baldwin FitzGilbert. The tenure of the barony is obscure for the twenty years following his death in 1090. After that it was held by the heiress Maud d'Avranches until her death in 1173, and then passed to her daughter, Hawise de Curci (died 1219), who married Reginald de Courtenay. His French possessions were confiscated by the French King Louis VII, but were given, together with the marriage of his daughter Elizabeth de Courtenay, to his youngest brother Peter I of Courtenay. The Courtenay family rebuilt Okehampton Castle, until King Henry VIII seized the lands and had Henry Courtenay, 1st Marquess of Exeter executed for treason in 1539. The castle is now owned by English Heritage and is open to the public during the summer season. The town is also home to the Museum of Dartmoor Life, which has received notable visitors such as the then-Prince Charles.

Political representation
Okehampton elected two members to the Unreformed House of Commons. The Reform Act of 1832 abolished its representation as a rotten borough.

Military presence
There is a substantial army training camp on Dartmoor which can be reached via Okehampton, and is commonly referred to as "Okehampton Camp". It is managed by the Defence Training Estate, and used by a variety of military units, including the Commando Training Centre Royal Marines (CTCRM), Lympstone, Devon, and many cadet training units. The Ten Tors event is run by the Army each year in early May from Okehampton Camp.

Education
Schools in the town include Okehampton Primary School and Okehampton College. There are also a number of smaller primary schools in the surrounding areas for children within the catchment area of Okehampton that include South Tawton, Hatherleigh, Chagford, North Tawton and Bridestowe.

Religion 

The Anglican parish church of All Saints is located on Church Path, on a slight hill to the west of the town centre. A church has stood at this site since Saxon times and it is certain that a church existed here before the first recorded consecration by Bishop Bronescombe of Exeter in 1261. The medieval building, which resulted from a further re-building in 1447, was destroyed by fire in 1842. It was rebuilt again by John Hayward. Only a  granite ashlar tower survived the blaze and was incorporated into the new church.

Inside the church are the remains of the old stone reredos against the west wall of the south aisle. The current reredos is of stone and was built in 1891 by Harry Hems and the choir stalls and altar rails date from 1892. The pulpit was installed in 1872. Notable stained glass windows in the church include the south window by Morris & Co. depicting St Cecilia and the Angels. The North Window is by the Kemp studios and others are by Ward and Hughes. In the Lady Chapel there is a small section of medieval glass displayed in a cabinet beside the altar. The church is a Grade II* listed building

Fairplace United Church is located on St James Street, in the town centre, opposite the Post Office and represents both the Methodist and United Reformed Church traditions. Historically Wesleyan (New Road), Bible Christian (East Street) and Congregationalist (Ebenezer) congregations first met in people's homes and public rooms until congregations were large enough ft need church buildings. Fairplace Church was completed in 1904, firstly for the Wesleyan Methodists, joined in 1962 by those from the Bible Christian tradition (although the Methodist Church had united in 1932) and amalgamating with the United Reform Church in 1974.

The Baptist Chapel on Fore Street was built in 1889 and enlarged in 1901. Services are held every Sunday. The Okehampton New Life Church, a Pentecostal church of the Assemblies of God, is located on New Road, in what was formerly the Wesleyan Methodist church. There is also a Jehovah's Witnesses hall on East Street and the Catholic church of St Boniface on Station Road. A priest from St Boniface College in Plymouth was appointed as the visiting chaplain for Okehampton Camp.

Sport
The town's football team, Okehampton Argyle F.C., is a non-league club which was established in 1926 after the original side, Okehampton Town, disbanded. The club competes in the South West Peninsula League which sits at Steps 6 and 7 of the National League System; four leagues below the top division of non-league football, the Football Conference. The town also has a rugby club, Okehampton RFC, which is believed to have been founded in 1884. There is also a table tennis club in the town that was purpose-built for the sport beside the local post office off the town.

Transport
Okehampton's location at the edge of the moor means that it has always been a route centre. After years of uncertainty, the  A30 trunk road was finally re-routed in 1988 to bypass the town, which had previously acted as a holiday traffic bottleneck at summer weekends.
Okehampton railway station is on the former northerly rail route from Exeter St Davids to Plymouth via Tavistock. In 1997, Devon County Council revived a passenger rail service from Exeter, on summer weekends only, in an attempt to reduce motor traffic to the national park, which became a summer Sunday service, operated at its closure by Great Western Railway. In March 2010, the freight operator Devon & Cornwall Railways announced plans to reinstate a daily passenger service terminating in Exeter,though this never came to fruition. The station was also previously served by heritage trains, but closed to all services in 2019.

Okehampton station then reopened to a regular service on 20 November 2021 as part of refurbishment of the line. The Dartmoor Line, as it is now called, opened with a two hourly service to Exeter St Davids, but this will increase to hourly in Spring 2022.

In the wake of widespread disruption caused by damage to the mainline track at Dawlish by coastal storms in February 2014, leaving Plymouth and Cornwall with no rail connection to the rest of the country, Network Rail considered reopening the Exeter-to-Plymouth route via Okehampton and Tavistock.

Okehampton is served by various bus services from Exeter, Bude, Newquay and Tavistock. Stagecoach South West service 6 links from Exeter bus station via Exeter St Davids to Okehampton and then to Bude. Other services from Exeter bus station include the 6A service via Exeter St Davids, which continues to Launceston. There was formerly a town service numbered 318, but it was withdrawn in 2015.

Nearby settlements
Okehampton is surrounded by many smaller villages and towns. Notable examples are the villages of South Zeal with its ancient burgage plots, granite thatched cottages and Dartmoor Folk Festival; Belstone on the outskirts of Dartmoor; and Sticklepath which has an annual fire show on Bonfire Night, 5 November. Other nearby villages and settlements include Hatherleigh, North Tawton, Whiddon Down, Chagford, Bratton Clovelly, Lydford, Folly Gate, Southcott, Northlew, Jacobstowe, Bridestowe and Sourton.

Further reading
Some Account of the Barony and Town of Okehampton; Bridges, W. B.; Thomas, C.; Fothergill, H. G.; new ed. by Wright, W. H. K.; Tiverton: W. Masland, 1889 (Plymouth: printed and published, for the Proprietors, by G. P. Hearder, c. 1889)

References

External links

 
Dartmoor
Towns in Devon
Roman fortifications in Devon
Borough of West Devon